Jean-Paul Rouve (born 26 January 1967) is a French actor, film director, screenwriter and producer. He is a member of the troupe "Les Robins des Bois".

He has appeared in more than thirty film and television productions since 1993.

Personal life
He lived several years with the novelist Bénédicte Martin; the couple had a child.
He's graduated from the Florent school in Paris, where he studied theater in the class of Francis Huster with Gregory Herpe, Eric Ruf, Jeanne Balibar, Edouard Baer, Valerie Bonneton, etc.

Filmography

Filmmaker

Actor

References

External links

1967 births
Living people
French male film actors
French male television actors
People from Dunkirk
French film directors
French male screenwriters
French screenwriters
Cours Florent alumni
French film producers
French male stage actors
Most Promising Actor César Award winners
20th-century French male actors
21st-century French male actors